Merseybeat, or beat music, is a musical genre that originated in Liverpool, England in the 1950s.

Merseybeat, Merseybeats, or Mersey Beat may refer to:

Mersey Beat, a music newspaper
Merseybeat (TV series), a television series
The Merseybeats, an English beat band